Notonomus dyscoloides is a species of ground beetle in the subfamily Pterostichinae. It was described by Victor Motschulsky in 1865.

References

Notonomus
Beetles described in 1865